Pierre Phelipon (born 5 February 1935) is a French former professional footballer and manager. In his playing days, he was a defender. He is known for being the first manager in the history of Paris Saint-Germain.

Honours 
Paris Saint-Germain

 Division 2: 1970–71

References

External links

Phelipon at Planète PSG

1935 births
Living people
French footballers
Racing Club de France Football players
Stade Français (association football) players
Grenoble Foot 38 players
FC Rouen players
Angoulême Charente FC players
Paris Saint-Germain F.C. players
Stade Saint-Germain players
FC Girondins de Bordeaux players
French football managers
Paris Saint-Germain F.C. managers
Angoulême Charente FC managers
FC Girondins de Bordeaux managers
Tours FC managers
Stade de Reims managers
Association football defenders
Association football player-managers